Antigone was a Macedonian noblewoman who lived in the 4th century BC.

She was born to Cassander by unnamed mother. Antigone was the niece of the Regent Antipater. Her father and paternal uncle were the sons of Iolaus and through her father Antigone was a distant collateral relative to the Argead dynasty.

Antigone was originally from either Paliura or Eordaea. Little is known of her life. Antigone married a Macedonian nobleman of obscure origin called Magas who was from Eordaea. Antigone and Magas lived in Eordaea and had a daughter called Berenice I of Egypt.

The colony of Antigonia was named after her and her granddaughter of the same name.

References

Sources
 Berenice I article at Livius.org
 Ptolemaic Genealogy: Berenice I
 Ptolemaic Dynasty - Affiliated Lines: Antipatrids
 W. Heckel, Who's who in the age of Alexander the Great: prosopography of Alexander's empire, Wiley-Blackwell, 2006

4th-century BC Macedonians
4th-century BC Greek women
Ancient Macedonian women
Ptolemaic dynasty
Antipatrid dynasty